Saint Paul may refer to the following places in the U.S. state of Kentucky:
Saint Paul, Grayson County, Kentucky
Saint Paul, Lewis County, Kentucky